Sanjalice (trans. The Dreamers) were a Yugoslav rock band formed in Belgrade in 1964. Sanjalice are notable for being one of the pioneers of the Yugoslav rock scene, as well as one of the first Yugoslav all-female bands.

History
Sanjalice were formed at the end of 1964, when three female friends, Ljiljana Mandić, Slobodanka Miščević and Ljiljana Jevtić, all three living in the same building, decided to form a band influenced by the Beach Boys and the Walker Brothers. The band's first lineup consisted of Ljiljana Mandić (vocals, guitar), Slobodanka Miščević (rhythm guitar, vocals), Ljiljana Jevtić (bass guitar), Vojislav Veljković (drums), and Radomir Vuković (organ), most of them at the time being elementary school students. Sanjalice had their first performance on December 29, 1964 in Belgrade's Pionirski Grad, performing alongside duo DD and singers Zoran Rambosek and Mirko Šuoc.

In 1965, the band performed, alongside the bands Lutalice, Četiri Bebe, Siluete, Plamenih 5, Juniori, Plavi Dečaci and Elipse, on the Parada ritma festival. At the end of 1966, Vojislav Veljković left the band and went to serve his mandatory stint in the Yugoslav army, and was replaced by Snežana Veselinović, who was his girlfriend at the time. Not wanting to be the only male member of the band, Radomir Vuković left the band, and Sanjalice continued their activity without an organist, as one of the first all-female bands in Yugoslavia. As one of the rare all-female rock bands in Yugoslavia, Sanjalice gained large attention of the media, but also praise from the music press.

On a competition of bands entitled Belgrade — Zagreb and held in 1967, they won the first place. During the same year, they performed on a highly popular festival tour Letnji karavan (Summer Caravan), which featured popular pop music singers. During 1967, Sanjalice performed on the fashion shows presenting the Simonida collection, inspired by Serbian medieval frescoes, by the Yugoslav designer Aleksandar Joksimović. When the Simonida collection was presented in Romania, the band traveled to the country to perform on the fashion shows, appearing also on Romanian national radio and television. During the same year, they released their first EP, which featured the songs "Idem u svet" ("I'm Going to Travel the World", a cover of Wilma Goich's song "Per vedere quanto e' grande il mondo"), "Bez reči" ("Without Words"), "Nemoj reći da me voliš" ("Don't Say that You Love Me", a cover of Pino Donaggio's song "Io che non vivo (senza te)"), and "Mi mladi" ("We the Young"). The EP was released through Jugoton record labeel. Later that year, they released their second EP, with the songs "Marioneta" ("Marionette", a cover of Sandie Shaw song "Puppet on a String"), "Znam da ćeš se vratiti" ("I Know You Will Come Back"), "Haj, Lili, haj-lo", and "Srećni zajedno" ("Happy Together", a cover of The Turtles's song "Happy Together"), through Diskos record label. By the end of 1967, the band had made more than 600 performances, but also several appearances on TV Belgrade, TV Zagreb and TV Ljubljana, some of them in children's program.

In 1968, the band was offered to perform in West Germany and Lebanon, which they refused to spent the summer performing on the Adriatic coast. They spent two months performing in Pula and other cities in Istria. During the same year, they released their third EP, with songs "Marijana" (originally a chanson composed by Vlaho Paljetak), "To su bili dani" ("Those Were the Days", a cover of Mary Hopkin song "Those Were the Days"), "Ta mala ledi" ("That Little Lady"), "Misli ponekad na mene" ("Think of Me Sometimes"), through Beograd Disk. In 1968, Slobodanka Miščević sang the theme song for the film Pusti snovi (Pipedreams) directed by Soja Jovanović. The song was released on the EP Muzika iz filma Pusti snovi (Music from the Film Pipedreams).

During their career, Sanjalice often performed on fashion shows presenting clothes designed by Aleksandar Joksimović. They performed in the play Bitnici pevaju (Beatniks Are Singing), performed in the Đuro Salaj Theatre, in which actors Dragan Nikolić, Miša Janketić, Duško Golumbovski, and others performed the poetry of American beatniks translated by Jovan Ćirilov.

In 1969, the members of the band decided to end their activity and dedicate themselves to their studies.

Discography

Extended plays
Idem u svet (1967)
Marioneta (1967)
Marijana (1968)

References

External links
Sanjalice at Discogs

Serbian rock music groups
Yugoslav rock music groups
Beat groups
All-female bands
Musical groups from Belgrade
Musical groups established in 1964
Musical groups disestablished in 1969